MORF4 family-associated protein 1 is a protein that in humans is encoded by the MRFAP1 gene.

Interactions 

MRFAP1 has been shown to interact with MORF4L1 and Retinoblastoma protein.

References

Further reading